Kutela Cove (‘Zaliv Kutela’ \'za-liv ku-'te-la\) is the 330 m wide cove indenting for 750 m the east coast of Clarence Island in the South Shetland Islands, Antarctica.  It is entered just south of Cape Lloyd.

The cove is named after the settlement of Kutela in Southern Bulgaria.

Location
British mapping in 1972 and 2009.

Maps
British Antarctic Territory. Scale 1:200000 topographic map. DOS 610 Series, Sheet W 61 54. Directorate of Overseas Surveys, Tolworth, UK, 1972.
South Shetland Islands: Elephant, Clarence and Gibbs Islands. Scale 1:220000 topographic map. UK Antarctic Place-names Committee, 2009.
 Antarctic Digital Database (ADD). Scale 1:250000 topographic map of Antarctica. Scientific Committee on Antarctic Research (SCAR). Since 1993, regularly upgraded and updated.

References
 Bulgarian Antarctic Gazetteer. Antarctic Place-names Commission. (details in Bulgarian, basic data in English)
 Kutela Cove. SCAR Composite Gazetteer of Antarctica

External links
 Kutela Cove. Copernix satellite image

Coves of the South Shetland Islands
Bulgaria and the Antarctic